Janko Perić (born February 24, 1949), is a former Canadian politician. Perić was the Liberal Party MP for the riding of Cambridge from 1993 to 2004.

He was born in Orehovica near Bedekovčina, Croatia and was a welder.

Perić was defeated in the 2004 federal election by Gary Goodyear of the Conservative Party, with a margin of 224 votes. Perić tried to win his seat back in the 2006 federal election, but lost by almost 6000 votes.

Electoral record

External links

1949 births
Living people
Canadian people of Croatian descent
Liberal Party of Canada MPs
Members of the House of Commons of Canada from Ontario
People from Cambridge, Ontario
People from Bedekovčina
21st-century Canadian politicians